Prunum torticulum is a species of sea snail, a marine gastropod mollusk in the family Marginellidae, the margin snails.

Description

Distribution
P. torticulum can be found in the Gulf of Mexico, ranging from Georgia to Puerto Rico.

References

Marginellidae
Gastropods described in 1881